Mandla Mashimbyi (born 10 November 1980) is a South African former cricketer. He played in 48 first-class and 49 List A matches between 2003 and 2010. From the 2013/14 season, he became the coach of the Titans in South Africa's domestic cricket competitions. In August 2021, he was named as the bowling coach of the national team for their series against Sri Lanka, after Charl Langeveldt was ruled out of the tour due to a positive test for COVID-19.

References

External links
 

1980 births
Living people
South African cricketers
Knights cricketers
Griqualand West cricketers
Northerns cricketers
Titans cricketers
People from Phalaborwa
Sportspeople from Limpopo